Walter Prichard Eaton (August 24, 1878 – 1957) was an American theatre critic and author.  He was born in Massachusetts, graduated from Harvard, and was a drama critic for various newspapers and magazines.  He also wrote numerous books on the theater and was a professor of playwriting at Yale. His papers are at the Albert and Shirley Small Special Collections Library at the University of Virginia.

References

External links
 
 
 Works by Walter Prichard Eaton at The Online Books Page
 Walter Prichard Eaton Papers. Yale Collection of American Literature, Beinecke Rare Book and Manuscript Library.

1878 births
1957 deaths
American magazine writers
American critics
Harvard University alumni
People from Malden, Massachusetts
Members of the American Academy of Arts and Letters